Pierre Ozanne (Brest, 1737–Brest, 1813 ) was a French naval artist and engineer, brother of Nicolas Ozanne.

Biography 
From 1750, Ozanne was schooled at the Ecole des Gardes de la Marine, ancestor of the École Navale, and in Paris, where he was a pupil of Duhamel du Monceau. He returned to Brest in 1764 with a commission of drawing professor at the naval academy.

From 1771 to 1772, he took part in a scientific expedition on the frigate , and in 1776, on the Boussole.

After the start of the American war of Independence, Ozanne served on Languedoc and on the Vautour.

In 1788, he directed the plans of the 74-gun , earning a commission of naval engineer in the process.

In 1801, he was made a captaine de vaisseau. He was present at the Crown of Napoleon, representing naval engineering.

Ozanne retired in 1811 in Brest.

References

1737 births
1813 deaths
French artists
French naval architects